Sringapuram (Malayalam: ശൃംഗപുരം) is a village in the Thrissur district of Kerala state, India. It is located about 2 km from the town of Kodungallur.

Places of worship 
 Sringapuram Mahadeva Temple
 Sri Kumara Subramanya Swamy Temple
 Kunnumpuram Temple
 Durga Bhagwati Temple at Pararath
 Thiruvanchikkulam Mahadeva Temple
 Sri Dharmashastha Temple Sringapuram
 St. Mary's Church

Educational institutions 
 Government Higher Secondary School
 Bharatiya Vidha Bhavans School

Roads 
 Kodakara Kodungallur Highway
 Palpu College Road

References

 Villages in Thrissur district